Robert Michael Dow Jr. (born 1965) is a United States district judge of the United States District Court for the Northern District of Illinois and concurrently serves as counselor to Chief Justice John Roberts.

Education and career

Born in Madison, Wisconsin, Dow received a Bachelor of Arts from Yale University in 1987, a Doctor of Philosophy from the University of Oxford in 1990, and a Juris Doctor from Harvard Law School in 1993. He was a law clerk for Judge Joel Flaum of the United States Court of Appeals for the Seventh Circuit from 1993 to 1994. He was in private practice in Chicago from 1995 to 2007. He serves as an adjunct professor at Northwestern University Pritzker School of Law where he teaches complex litigation.

Federal judicial service

On July 17, 2007, Dow was nominated by President George W. Bush to a seat on the United States District Court for the Northern District of Illinois vacated by Charles P. Kocoras. He was confirmed by the United States Senate on November 13, 2007, and received his commission on December 5, 2007.

Notable case 

On December 2, 2010, Judge Dow ruled against five states (Michigan, Pennsylvania, Ohio, Minnesota, and Wisconsin), stating that five Chicago-area shipping locks will stay open despite the risk that Lake Michigan Asian carp pose to the multi-billion dollar fishing industry, saying not enough evidence was presented that indicated the danger was truly imminent. Closing the locks could undermine commerce and pose flood-control problems.

Counselor to the Chief Justice 
On October 3, 2022, the Supreme Court announced that John Roberts had appointed Dow to serve as counselor to the chief justice, a role which acts as the chief justice's chief of staff. He succeeded Jeffrey P. Minear, who retired in September 2022.

References

External links

1965 births
Living people
21st-century American judges
Alumni of the University of Oxford
Harvard Law School alumni
Judges of the United States District Court for the Northern District of Illinois
Lawyers from Madison, Wisconsin
United States district court judges appointed by George W. Bush
Yale University alumni